Highway 137 (AR 137, Ark. 137, and Hwy. 137) is a north–south state highway in Mississippi County, Arkansas. The route runs  from Highway 312 north to the Missouri state line.

Route description
Highway 137 begins east of Blytheville and runs east from Highway 312. The route serves as the northern terminus for its spur route before turning due north at Hickman. After serving as the eastern terminus for Highway 150, the route continues north along the Mississippi River until terminating at MO-SSR-K/NN at the Missouri state line. The road is a two-lane, undivided, rural route for its entire length.

History
The route became a state highway in 1930, running from Highway 18 north to the Mississippi River. Highway 150 was added to the system around 1940, and the two routes both ended at Huffman. Highway 137 was first paved in 1951, and extended north to Missouri in 1958. The highway was rerouted west to Highway 312 upon the creation of Highway 137S in 1996.

Major intersections

Armorel spur

Arkansas Highway 137 Spur is a former spur route serving Armorel.

Major intersections

See also

 List of state highways in Arkansas

References

External links

137
Transportation in Mississippi County, Arkansas